Parliamentary elections were held in the Republic of Serbia on 19 December 1993. The Socialist Party of Serbia (SPS) emerged as the largest party in the National Assembly, winning 123 of the 250 seats. Following the elections, the SPS formed a government with New Democracy, which had run as part of the Democratic Movement of Serbia coalition.

Background
The elections were boycotted by political parties of ethnic Kosovo Albanians, who made up about 17% of the population.

Electoral lists 
Following electoral lists are electoral lists that received seats in the National Assembly after the 1993 election:

Results

References

Serbia
1993
Elections in Serbia and Montenegro
1993 in Serbia
Serbia
1993 elections in Serbia